For the Swedish musician, see Daniel Håkansson

Daniel Håkansson (born March 13, 1996) is a Swedish ice hockey player who played with Linköpings HC of the Swedish Hockey League.

Håkansson made his Swedish Hockey League debut playing with Linköpings HC during the 2014–15 SHL season.

References

External links

1996 births
Living people
Linköping HC players
Swedish ice hockey forwards
Sportspeople from Linköping